Helge Rosvaenge (born Helge Anton Rosenvinge Hansen, August 29, 1897June 17, 1972) was a Danish-born operatic tenor whose career was centred on Germany and Austria, before, during and after World War II. His last name is sometimes spelled Roswaenge or Rosvænge.

Rosvaenge was born in Copenhagen. However, his life was spent in Germany, and he made his debut at Neustrelitz as Don Jose in Carmen in 1921. Engagements followed at Altenburg, Basel, Cologne (1927–30) and the Berlin State Opera, where he was leading tenor from 1930 to 1944, being especially distinguished in the Italian repertory. He also sang regularly at the Vienna State Opera from 1936, and in Munich. Rosvaenge also appeared at the Salzburg Festival, making his debut there in Der Rosenkavalier. Other roles which he performed at Salzburg between 1933 and 1939 were Tamino in The Magic Flute, Huon in Oberon and Florestan in Fidelio. His London debut at the Royal Opera House, Covent Garden, occurred in 1938, as Florestan.

He sang Parsifal at the Bayreuth Festival in 1934 and 1936, but otherwise the Wagnerian repertory was mostly on recordings.

He also appeared in films, such as Verlieb' dich nicht am Bodensee (1935) and Last Rose (1936).

After World War II, Rosvaenge divided his time between Berlin and Vienna. He continued to sing until May 30, 1959 (when he gave what was billed as his farewell concert at Vienna's Great Musikvereinssaal), singing arias from Turandot as Calàf, Aida as Radamès and Il trovatore as Manrico. His voice showed little sign of age; it was still warm and sonorous throughout its range, and brilliant and lustrous in its upper register. Indeed, he could produce an easy and full-blooded high D during his vocal prime.  This can be heard in one of his most celebrated recordings, the Postillon's Song ("Mes amis, écoutez l'histoire") from Le postillon de Lonjumeau by Adolphe Adam.

Rosvaenge appeared in a wide spectrum of roles ranging from Mozart to Weber, from Verdi to Puccini. He sang with "a steely voice, brilliant high notes and insistent declamation throughout its scale" which was "brilliant and lustrous in its top register", according to Luiz Eduardo Goncalves Gabarra. He was equally impressive as Andrea Chénier and was also an acclaimed and exciting Radamès and Otello, in which latter role he was often heard on German radio.

He toured the US before retiring, and died in Munich at 74.

Repertoire

Recordings
Rosvaenge was a prolific recording artist starting as early as 1927, first for the Gramophone Company (now EMI) and later on the Telefunken, Parlophone and Odeon labels. Many of these recordings have been reissued on CD. The finest of them were made in the 1930s and early 1940s.

A recording of his solo tenor singing in a 1938 performance of Verdi's Requiem with the BBC Symphony Orchestra conducted by Arturo Toscanini has been released on CD as well.

References

External links
 Harold Rosenthal at https://web.archive.org/web/20030802074831/http://www.bassocantante.com/opera/rosvaenge.html
 History of the Tenor / Helge Rosvaenge / Sound Clips and Narration

1897 births
1972 deaths
German operatic tenors
20th-century German male opera singers
Danish emigrants to Germany